The 'Two Layer' Hypothesis, or immigration hypothesis, is an archaeological hypothese that suggests the human occupation of mainland Southeast Asia occurred over two distinct periods by two separate racial groups, hence the term 'layer'.  According to the Two Layer Hypothesis, early indigenous Australo-Melanesian peoples comprised the first population of Southeast Asia before their genetic integration with a second wave of inhabitants from East Asia, including Southern China, during the agricultural expansion of the Neolithic.
The majority of evidence for the Two Layer Hypothesis consists of dental and morphometric analyses from archaeological sites throughout Southeast Asia, most prominently Thailand and Vietnam.

Recent genetic and archeologic evidence found that both Australo-Melanesian and East Asian-related  populations migrated along a southern route, with the Australo-Melanesians using a coastal route along the coast of the Indian peninsula into Insular Southeast Asia and Oceania, while East Asian-related groups used a route south or through the Himalayan mountain range into Mainland Southeast Asia, from where Basal-East Asians than expanded northwards and southwards respectively at 50,000BC. East Asian-related ancestry was far more widespread in Insular Southeast Asia than previously suggested, long predating the Austroasiatic and Austronesian expansions.

Early hypothese 

The first fossilized skeletal remains and indication of early 'Proto-Australian' Southeast Asian inhabitants surfaced in 1920 during an excavation by Dubois on the island of Java.  Despite this, a formal connection to mainland Southeast Asia and the suggestion of an initial population of Australomelanesoids was not suggested until 1952 by Koenigswald in his response to Hooijer,  who sharply criticized the attribution of 'big toothed' dental remains to early Australo-Melanesians.
The immigration hypothesis proposed by Koenigswald was formally termed the 'Two Layer' model by Jacob Teuku. In 1967, Teuku analyzed the cranial and dental proportions of 152 adult skeletal samples recovered from prehistoric sites in Malaysia and Indonesia, the majority displaying robust jaws and teeth, prominent glabellae, and slender, elongated limbs. Teuku argued these characteristics correspond to the Australo-Melanesian population proposed by Koenigswald that predated the East Asian immigrants of the Neolithic; also suggesting the initial inhabitants were likely forced south of Southeast Asia's mainland by the second wave of migrants, due to resource competition or conflict.

Modern debates and controversies 

The main controversy concerning the 'Two Layer' hypothesis is whether or not the evolutionary process truly involved the Australo-Melanesians. Archaeologists such as Matsumura suggest Southern Chinese people comprised the initial population of Southeast Asia, rather than Australo-Melanesians while researchers such as Turner argue that prehistoric Southeast Asians did not mix with either racial group.
Though the early prehistoric Vietnamese and Malaysians both resembled the Australo-Melanesian samples the most, the Mán Bạc people had a greater resemblance to the Đông Sơn samples dating back to the Iron Age. Analyzing cranial and dental remains, Matsumura concluded based on chronological differences that the Mán Bạc people were immigrants affiliated with peoples near the Yangtze River region in Southern China. Molecular anthropologists have used classical genetic markers and mtDNA to analyze the similarities between early Chinese and Southeast Asians. Such genetic markers suggest the genetic layout of Southern Chinese peoples is quite similar to that of Southeast Asians.

Other controversies completely reject the 'Two Layer' hypothesis. Using dental evidence, Turner’s Sundadont/Sinodont hypothesis suggests the “Sundadont” trait seen in present-day Southeast Asians is a result of long-standing continuity. Turner created a cluster analysis of MMD values in order to test existing hypotheses of origins, concluding that all Southeast Asians, Micronesians, Polynesians, and Jomonese form their own branch and descend from a common ancestor. The Australians and Melanesians, however, are scattered over the African and European branch along with a side branch of Tasmanians and Solomon Islanders. Howell analyzed crania of major racial branches worldwide, and linked Australian and Melanesian cranial morphology most closely with African cranials. Howell discovered, however, that the size and features of present-day Asian cranial morphology differed significantly from that of Australians, Melanesians, and Africans.

Several studies in 2021 concluded that East Asian-related ancestry originated and expanded from Mainland Southeast Asia at about 50,000BC. East Asian-related ancestry was far more widespreaded in Southeast Asia than previously suggested. Ancient remains of hunter-gatherers in Maritime Southeast Asia, such as one Holocene hunter-gatherer from South Sulawesi, had ancestry from both the Papuan-related and East Asian-related branches of the Eastern non-African lineage. The hunter-gatherer individual had approximately ~50% "Basal-East Asian" ancestry, and was positioned in between modern East Asians and Papuans of Oceania. The authors concluded that East Asian-related ancestry expanded from Mainland Southeast Asia into Maritime Southeast Asia much earlier than previously suggested, as early as 25,000BC, long before the expansion of Austroasiatic and Austronesian groups.

Distinctive Basal-East Asian (East-Eurasian) ancestry was recently found to have originated in Mainland Southeast Asia at ~50,000BC, and expanded through multiple migration waves southwards and northwards respectively. Geneflow of East-Eurasian ancestry into Maritime Southeast Asia and Oceania could be estimated to ~25,000BC (possibly also earlier since 50,000BC). The pre-Neolithic Papuan-related populations of Maritime Southeast Asia were largely replaced by the expansion of various East Asian-related populations, beginning about 25,000BC from Mainland Southeast Asia. Southeast Asia was dominated by East Asian-related ancestry already in 15,000BC, predating the expansion of Austroasiatic and Austronesian peoples.

See also 
Southeast Asian History
Early human migrations

References

Further reading 

Antón, S. C. (2002). Evolutionary significance of cranial variation in Asian Homo erectus. American Journal of Physical Anthropology, 118(4), 301-323.
Bellwood, P. (2007). Prehistory of the Indo-Malaysian archipelago. ANU E Press.
Hill, C., Soares, P., Mormina, M., Macaulay, V., Clarke, D., Blumbach, P. B., ... & Richards, M. (2007). A mitochondrial stratigraphy for island southeast Asia. The American Journal of Human Genetics, 80(1), 29-43.
Nguyen, V. (2005). The Da But culture: Evidence for cultural development in Vietnam during the middle Holocene. Bulletin of the Indo-Pacific Prehistory Association, 25, 89-94.
Oota, H., Kurosaki, K., Pookajorn, S., Ishida, T., & Ueda, S. (2001). "Genetic study of the Paleolithic and Neolithic Southeast Asians. Human biology", 73(2), 225-231.
Pookajorn, S., Sinsakul, S., & Chaimanee, Y. (1994). "Final report of excavations at Moh-Khiew Cave, Krabi Province; Sakai Cave, Trang Province and ethnoarchaeological research of hunter-gatherer group, so-called Mani or Sakai or Orang Asli at Trang Province (the Hoabinhian Research Project in Thailand)". Bangkok: Silpakorn University.
Storm, P. (2001). The evolution of humans in Australasia from an environmental perspective. Palaeogeography, Palaeoclimatology, Palaeoecology, 171(3), 363-383.

External links 
Maps of early Austronesian settlement routes
Kota Tampan tools and settlement of Southeast Asia

Prehistoric migrations
Archaeological theory
Asian archaeology
Peopling of Southeast Asia
Pleistocene
Holocene